"Don't Stop (Color on the Walls)" is a song by American indie pop band Foster the People from their debut studio album Torches. Written by the band's frontman Mark Foster, the song was released as the fourth single from the album on January 10, 2012. "Don't Stop (Color on the Walls)" has been used in television commercial advertisements for the Nissan Versa. The song was also featured in videogame Forza Horizon and trailers for the movie Turbo. The song was written about what a four-year-old would do if they ruled the world.

Music video
The music video for "Don't Stop (Color on the Walls)" was filmed by Daniels in 3D in partnership with Digital Revolution Studios and released on December 8, 2011. It stars Foster alongside American actress Gabourey Sidibe.

In the video, Sidibe plays a driving student who unknowingly lets a con man (played by Foster) into her car, thinking he is the DMV examiner.  The con man and the student fight for control of the wheel as the car (a Toyota Tercel) moves, and end up attracting the attention of two police officers (played by Foster the People members Mark Pontius and Cubbie Fink) driving a Ford Crown Victoria Police Interceptor. They end up on a car chase around Hollywood, which ends when the con man gives himself up to the police and the student drives away.

At the 2012 3D Creative Arts Awards in Hollywood, the International 3D Society presented Digital Revolution Studios with a Lumiere Award for Best Television Short for the music video.

Personnel
Mark Foster – vocals, guitar, synthesizer, percussion, programming
Cubbie Fink – bass guitar
Mark Pontius – drums

Charts

Weekly charts

Year-end charts

Certifications

Release history

References

External links

2012 singles
Foster the People songs
Song recordings produced by Rich Costey
2011 songs
Columbia Records singles
Songs written by Mark Foster (singer)